British electronic music duo Autechre have released fifteen studio albums, seventeen EPs, and five singles. They have also released two collections of live recordings as digital downloads through their online store.

Albums

Studio albums

Live albums

Compilation albums

Extended plays

Peel Sessions

With The Hafler Trio

Singles

Other appearances

Autechre remixes of other artists

Music videos
 1993: "Basscadet (Bcdtmx)" (from "Basscadet" single)
 1995: "Second Bad Vilbel" (from the Anvil Vapre EP)
 2002: "Gantz Graf" (from the Gantz Graf EP)

Notes

References

Discographies of British artists
Electronic music group discographies